Uncollected is a compilation album by Galaxie 500, originally released in 1996 as a part of the Galaxie 500 box set. It was later reissued as a single disc in 2004 by Rykodisc Records

Track listing
All songs written by Galaxie 500 except as noted.
 "Cheese and Onions" (The Rutles) – 3:05
 "Them" – 3:42
 "Final Day" (Young Marble Giants) – 2:54
 "Blue Thunder" (w/sax) – 3:47
 "Maracas Song" – 3:53
 "Crazy" – 1:54
 "Jerome" – 2:46
 "Song in 3" – 3:26
 "Oblivious" – 3:21
 "I Can't Believe It's Me" – 3:57
 "Walking Song" – 2:51
 "The Other Side" – 4:55
 "On the Floor" – 2:49
 "Rain" / "Don't Let Our Youth Go to Waste" (The Beatles), (Jonathan Richman) – 8:52

Releases

References

External links
Lyrics and Tablature 

Galaxie 500 albums
2004 compilation albums
Rykodisc compilation albums